Northern Cyprus is divided into six districts, which are further divided into 12 sub-districts. Each district is governed by a Governor. On 27 December 2016, the Assembly of the Republic unanimously decided that the Lefke sub-district would be separated from the Güzelyurt District, establishing the Lefke District as the sixth district of Northern Cyprus.

See also
 Districts of Cyprus

References 

 
Subdivisions of Northern Cyprus